Vikarabad Assembly constituency is a SC reserved constituency of Telangana Legislative Assembly, India. It is one of 14 constituencies in the Ranga Reddy district. It is part of the Chevella Lok Sabha constituency.

Dr. Anand Methuku of Telangana Rashtra Samithi won the seat in the 2019 assembly election.

Mandals
The assembly constituency comprises the following mandals:

Members of Legislative Assembly

Election results

Telangana Legislative Assembly election, 2018

Telangana Legislative Assembly election, 2014

See also
 List of constituencies of Telangana Legislative Assembly
 Vikarabad

References

Assembly constituencies of Telangana
Ranga Reddy district